Draco cyanopterus is a species of agamid lizard. It is found in the Philippines.

References

Draco (genus)
Reptiles of the Philippines
Reptiles described in 1867
Taxa named by Wilhelm Peters